Sir Henry Bond, 2nd Baronet (died 1721) was an English Jacobite.

Biography
He was the eldest son of Sir Thomas Bond, 1st Baronet, and succeeded his father in the baronetcy in 1685. He was receiver-general in Ireland for King James II, and represented Portarlington in the Patriot Parliament of 1689. A non-juror, he accompanied James to France, for which he was attainted and his title and lands forfeited, though these were restored to him in 1707. He mostly lived abroad, and sold the family estate of Peckham to the Trevor family. On his death in 1721 he was succeeded by his son, Thomas.

References

1721 deaths
English Jacobites
Irish MPs 1689
Members of the Parliament of Ireland (pre-1801) for Portarlington
Baronets in the Baronetage of England